Frédéric Allard (born December 27, 1997) is a Canadian professional ice hockey defenceman for the Laval Rocket of the American Hockey League (AHL) while under contract to the Montreal Canadiens of the National Hockey League (NHL). He was selected by the Nashville Predators in the third-round, 78th overall, in the 2016 NHL Entry Draft.

Playing career
Allard played junior hockey for the Chicoutimi Saguenéens of the Quebec Major Junior Hockey League (QMJHL). After his selection by the Nashville Predators in the 2016 NHL Entry Draft, on September 30, 2016, Allard was signed to a three-year, entry-level contract. Allard skated four seasons for the Chicoutimi Saguenéens, tallying 34 goals and 177 points in 250 games while serving as an alternate captain in his final two campaigns.

Approaching the pandemic delayed 2020–21 season, and entering the final season of his entry-level contract with the Predators, Allard in order to continue playing accepted a European loan to Austrian ICE Hockey League club, EC VSV, on November 19, 2020. Initially assigned to Austria until the commencement of the Predators training camp, Allard having registered 2 goals and 3 points through 11 games was instead placed on waivers in order to continue his tenure with Villacher with the NHL season underway.

Allard placed third among the blueliners with 13 points in 25 games before he was reassigned by the Predators to the Chicago Wolves of the AHL on February 15, 2021. Producing 8 points through his first 7 games with the Wolves, Allard earned his first recall by the Predators on March 11, 2021, providing cover for injuries to star defenceman Roman Josi and Ryan Ellis. He made his NHL debut, playing almost 17 minutes for the Predators in a 6–3 defeat to the defending Stanley Cup champions, the Tampa Bay Lightning, on March 13, 2021.

During the 2021–22 season, Allard was traded by the Predators to the Los Angeles Kings in exchange for Brayden Burke on March 21, 2022. He was assigned to join AHL affiliate, the Ontario Reign, and immediately contributed offensively in posting 10 points through 15 games to end the regular season.

As a restricted free agent, Allard was re-signed by the Kings to a one-year, two-way contract extension on July 1, 2023. In the 2022–23 season, Allard continued on assignment with the Reign, however failed to repeat his offensive burst, in registering 2 goals and 7 points through 35 games.  

On March 3, 2023, the Kings traded Allard to the Montreal Canadiens in exchange for Nate Schnarr, he was immediately re-assigned to continue in the AHL with the Laval Rocket.

Career statistics

References

External links
 

1997 births
Living people
Canadian ice hockey defencemen
Chicago Wolves players
Chicoutimi Saguenéens (QMJHL) players
Laval Rocket players
Milwaukee Admirals players
Montreal Canadiens players
Nashville Predators draft picks
Nashville Predators players
Norfolk Admirals (ECHL) players
Ontario Reign (AHL) players
EC VSV players